Jake Rodgers (born September 10, 1991) is a former American football offensive tackle. He played college football at Washington State University and Eastern Washington and was drafted by the Atlanta Falcons in the seventh round of the 2015 NFL Draft. Rodgers has also been a member of the New York Giants, Carolina Panthers, Houston Texans, and Pittsburgh Steelers.

Professional career

Atlanta Falcons
Rodgers drafted by the Atlanta Falcons in the seventh round with the 225th overall pick of the 2015 NFL Draft. On September 4, 2015, he was waived by the Atlanta Falcons.

New York Giants
On December 8, 2015, the New York Giants signed Rodgers to their practice squad. On January 4, 2016, Rodgers signed a reserve/future contract with the Giants. On September 3, 2016, he was waived/injured by the Giants. He was released from injured reserve on September 12.

Carolina Panthers
On November 29, 2016, Rodgers was signed to the Panthers' practice squad. He was released on December 13, 2016. He signed a reserve/future contract with the Panthers on January 4, 2017. On May 2, 2017, Rodgers was waived by the Panthers.

Pittsburgh Steelers
On May 5, 2017, Rodgers signed with the Pittsburgh Steelers. He was waived by the team on September 2, 2017. He was re-signed to the practice squad on September 20, 2017, only to be released six days later. He was re-signed on October 18, 2017, but was released again on November 6.

Los Angeles Chargers
On November 15, 2017, Rodgers was signed to the Los Angeles Chargers' practice squad, but was released two days later.

Pittsburgh Steelers (second stint)
On November 20, 2017, Rodgers was signed to the Steelers' practice squad. He was released on December 21, 2017.

Houston Texans
On December 21, 2017, Rodgers was signed to the Houston Texans' practice squad. He signed a reserve/future contract with the Texans on January 1, 2018. He was waived by the Texans on May 1, 2018.

Pittsburgh Steelers (third stint)
On May 2, 2018, Rodgers was claimed off waivers by the Steelers. He was waived on September 1, 2018.

Baltimore Ravens
On December 12, 2018, Rodgers was signed to the Baltimore Ravens practice squad.

Denver Broncos
On April 22, 2019, Rodgers signed with the Denver Broncos. He was waived on September 1, 2019 and was re-signed to the practice squad. He was promoted to the active roster on September 14, 2019.

Rodgers re-signed with the Broncos on April 23, 2020. He was waived on September 5, 2020, and was signed to the practice squad the following day. He was elevated to the active roster on October 1 for the team's week 4 game against the New York Jets, and reverted to the practice squad after the game. He was promoted to the active roster on October 10. He was waived again on November 24.

Baltimore Ravens (second stint)
On November 25, 2020, Rodgers was claimed off waivers by the Baltimore Ravens. He was waived on December 7, 2020.

References

External links
Eastern Washington bio

1991 births
Living people
Players of American football from Spokane, Washington
American football offensive linemen
Washington State Cougars football players
Eastern Washington Eagles football players
Atlanta Falcons players
New York Giants players
Carolina Panthers players
Pittsburgh Steelers players
Los Angeles Chargers players
Houston Texans players
Baltimore Ravens players
Denver Broncos players